Chewin' the Fat is a Scottish comedy sketch show, starring Ford Kiernan, Greg Hemphill and Karen Dunbar. Comedians Paul Riley and Mark Cox also appeared regularly on the show among other actors such as Gregor Fisher and Tom Urie.

Chewin' the Fat first started as a radio series on BBC Radio Scotland. The later television show, which ran for four series, was first broadcast on BBC One Scotland, but series three and four, as well as highlights from the first two series, were later broadcast nationally across the United Kingdom. Although the last series ended in February 2002, a Hogmanay special was broadcast each New Year's Eve between 2000 and 2005.

Chewin' the Fat gave rise to the successful, and cult spin-off show Still Game, a sitcom focusing on the two elderly friends, Jack and Victor.

The series was mostly filmed in and around Glasgow and occasionally West Dunbartonshire.

The English idiom to chew the fat means to chat casually, but thoroughly, about subjects of mutual interest.

Recurring characters and sketches 
 Alistair (Hemphill) and Rory (Kiernan) Two eccentric documentary presenters from the Scottish Highlands, fascinated with Scottish history and landscapes. They are constantly harassed by two neds, who often play practical jokes on the pair or taunt them, shouting: "ya couple o' fannies!" The pranks vary from childish tricks (such as putting glue on the receiver of "Britain's most northerly phone box," which promptly sticks to Alistair's beard) to potentially lethal actions (such as rolling a caber down a mountainside at full tilt towards them); however, the pair of plucky Highlanders always live to present another show. The characters are partly based on the hosts of Scottish history programmes such as Weir's Way.
 The Big Man (Kiernan) The Big Man is a tough Glaswegian gangster, and a stereotypical representation of an "Alpha Male", who turns up to solve people's problems by means of intense intimidation and violence. Keeping with the "hard man" theme, he has a very deep voice. The character first appeared in a parody of Scotland Todays "Call The Lawyer" section, in which people having problems could get legal advice. The character was so popular after his first appearance that he appeared in other sketches; his catchphrase being: "Is there a problem here?" The Big Man is frequently hypocritical, usually demanding as payment whatever he had helped his clients receive. However, the people are always very happy to give him whatever he asks for.
 Bish & Bosh Two very dodgy painter & decorators who usually steal things from the houses they are working at. Their real names are Tony (Kiernan) and Wullie (Hemphill). In the sketches, they are normally seen having a tea break talking about something inconsequential that Wullie drags into depravity, only to be told by Tony, "You've taken that too far".
 The Banter Boys Two camp men who are regularly found nearby places where Glaswegian banter is common, taking great relish (and apparently even sexual arousal) experiencing the Glaswegian accent and patter in a variety of situations. This includes hiding out in a football team's changing room to hear the coach shouting at the players and taking a taxi ride in a complete circle back to where they got on, paying out with a £100 note for "the banter" they received from the driver. The two characters appear in the form of the stereotypical Kelvinside housewife, with the same pretensions and turns of phrase. Their catchphrase is "we're just paying for the banter". Their real names are James (Hemphill) and Gary (Kiernan). In earlier sketches, they were seen in a tearoom where they discuss various subjects often relating to Glaswegian banter and culture.
 Big Jock (Kiernan) An overbearing, narcissistic golfer who enjoys humiliating his fellow golf club members by making them do such things as retrieving a £50 note from a dustbin, or leaving another £50 note on the bar to see who would be desperate enough to pick it up for themselves. He is typically very loud and likes to make bombastic speeches and has a habit of calling everyone "Percy", even if it isn't their name. He also wins many trophies, and makes sure everyone knows about it.
 The Lighthouse Keepers Duncan (Hemphill) and Malcolm (Kiernan) are two Highlanders who work in a lighthouse on the fictional west coast island of Aonoch Mor. Their sketches usually featured at the start of the programme. Duncan endures pranks from Malcolm while pleading "Gonnae no dae that?" Malcolm's pranks gradually escalated in severity as the series went on, going from simple jokes to excruciating torture of the psyche, including drawing bras and undergarments over the unfortunate man's pornography (seemingly his only form of sexual gratification available) and pretending that he has hanged himself. The final sketch ends with the lighthouse being blown up, Duncan's trademark "Gonnae no dae that?" phrase being spoken as the unfortunate lighthouse keeper watches Malcolm sail away before the lighthouse explodes. 
 The Lonely Shopkeeper (Karen Dunbar) A bored, friendless woman working in a corner shop who is "stuck in this shop, day after day after day...", and therefore constantly trying to be over-friendly with her customers, and invariably frightening them off. She often attempts to pry into customers' personal lives, and comments on their (occasionally embarrassing) purchases. In the final sketch, she had seemingly faked her death to get sympathy of those that attended her wake within the shop.
 The Depressed Taxi Caller (Karen Dunbar) These sketches feature an extremely unlucky woman named Fiona working as a taxi controller, who is always shown crying down her headset to the drivers about her terrible life and how her new boyfriends keep dying in bizarre circumstances. She generally smokes many cigarettes and drinks large volumes of whisky throughout the sketch, in order to "dull the pain."
 Jack (Kiernan) and Victor (Hemphill) Two OAPs who get up to mischief, featuring the characters that were famously later to appear in the series Still Game.
 The Janny (Kiernan) A school janitor who pops up to try and fix everything from broken ankles to broken hearts with a liberal application of sawdust from his bucket. His catchphrase is "Gie that ten minutes an' it'll be as right as rain."
 The Boy Who Has Just Started MasturbatingA 14-year-old boy called Stephen (played by Gordon McCorkell) who is constantly embarrassed by his parents as they announce proudly to anyone they meet that he has just started masturbating. While other young people around him find this hilarious, most of the adults react by smiling and congratulating Stephen.
 Betty the Auld Slapper (Karen Dunbar) A female OAP, usually seen giving interviews to a "teatime [radio] show" about her memories from during the Second World War. These always end up with Betty describing her (numerous) sexual experiences in detail before being cut off by the show's exasperated host (Hemphill). She always sits with her legs spread wide apart, exposing her underwear. 
 The Community Mobile Van A van that brings various cultural amenities to the car park of a council estate, ranging from things like swimming pools to an art gallery to a theatre. The staff of the van are often harassed by a ned or two walking past. In reality, such vans would contain something like a Mobile Library, or the "Bionic Bus" which councils would send around local estates to keep the children amused.
 Miss Isabelle Gourlay, the Teacher (Karen Dunbar) A highly-strung, seemingly sexually-repressed teacher who gets overly offended by just about anything her class says, who take pleasure in winding her up as a result. Her catchphrase is: " Right, that's enough!" Apparently, she was based on a chemistry teacher Karen Dunbar had at her own school.
 Ballistic Bob (Kiernan) A man who attempts to do a normal task, fails multiple times or time takes too long, and ends up trashing the surrounding area in a frustrated rage. He was also featured in two Scottish adverts for broadband where he smashed up an entire office when a file took an infuriatingly long time to download from the Internet and his home study was wrecked when someone he was trying to call wouldn't answer the phone.
 The Nightshifters Two men who try to get some sleep for their night shift, but are always interrupted by too much noise. They follow the noise, and upon finding the culprit(s), the men shout "Haw, we're oan the night shift!". This noise can be anything from a loud football match to pens clicking.
 Gretta (Karen Dunbar)An outgoing female boss who hangs around two reluctant male employees at their desks whilst being obsessed with her moustache.
 Sluich Two sock puppets from the Scottish Highlands that get up to mischief, such as finding a "package" on the beach, then discovering that it is hash and proceed to produce a Rizla. They speak gibberish that is supposed to sound like Gaelic with English loan words to allow the audience to understand the gist of what they are saying, with their conversations beginning and ending with "oola."  It is a parody of the Gaelic-language children's programme "Dòtaman."
 Mr. Simpson (Kiernan)A man with a whistling lisp, which often gets satirised by other people by having him say a phrase with the pronunciation of the letter "S" strewn throughout, such as his niece and nephew having him read "The Night Before Christmas" from the beginning (the sketch begins with him finishing it, on the last sentence where the letter "S" not present.) So he reads it as (lisps are in bold) "Twas the night before christmas, and all through the house, not a creature was stirring, not even a mouse."
 The Smoking FamilyA family of chain smokers who only spend their money on their incredibly heavy addiction to cigarettes. They have all lost their voices (due to throat cancer) so they have to rely on voice boxes to communicate. One scene includes the young grandson who, wishing to 'have a fag', invites the opportunity for grandad to 'grab the camera' for the boy's first ever cigarette.
 The Sewer Workers Two sewer workers who find strange ways of amusing themselves in the sewer, including playing with faeces.
 Ronald Villiers (Kiernan)The world's worst actor, with a gravelly, monotonous voice. Ronald is apparently registered with the agent "Widdecombe & Pump." When presented with any script or concept, he invariably responds, "Ah can dae that", but he is incapable of remembering simple lines, often completely misunderstands the directions of the director, and attempts inappropriate ad-libs.
 Gym Teacher (Hemphill) A flatulent gym teacher who demonstrates physical activity to his class, and ends up passing gas from exertion. After this happens, the class laughs at him as he then yells "Simmer down!"
 The Sniffer (Karen Dunbar) A woman who can smell "shite", often in the form of a scam or a lie, from a distance away. According to her mail, her name is Olive Actory, a play on olfactory.
 The Shoe Sniffer (Hemphill) A man with an extreme fetish for sniffing other people's shoes; he usually distracts them and then sniffs them in a surreptitious manner.
 Bob (Hemphill) & Alan (Kiernan) Two overbearing salesmen in an electronics store who frequently try to put their "sales pitch" on expecting customers. They will usually attempt to completely confuse the customer, often using entirely fictional or inappropriate terminology to describe everyday electronics equipment. They also end up insulting the customers by using offensive and overly familiar terms, such as distorting the person's own name until it becomes a personal insult towards them.
 Socially Awkward Car salesman A car salesman (played by Mark Cox) who stands in a group with three other car salesmen (Kiernan, Hemphill, and Paul Riley) that have a laugh with each other by making comments or noises in relation to a subject. When it gets to his turn, he becomes overbearing by making loud noises or gestures, resulting in the other car salesmen walking away in embarrassment.
 Milk Lemonade Chocolate Different characters in competitive, or disagreeing situations, who proceed to taunt the losing side by chanting "Milk Lemonade Chocolate", pointing to their breasts, crotch, and posteriors respectively.
 Oo-oo-hh, fancy!A sketch featuring a different group of people each time. The group will be comparing items (packed lunches, drinks bought at a bar, etc.). All but the last item will be stereotypically "normal" or "working-class" – but the last person will have something considered "posh". On hearing this sophisticated item everyone else in the group will put their hands by their cheeks – wiggling their fingers – and chant 'OO-OO-HH Fancy!'. The most infamous example is the "Cheese Baguette", as being slightly more sophisticated than an ordinary cheese sandwich, that it is still commonly used as a comedic taunt within social groups.
 Eric the Activist (Hemphill) A deranged animal rights activist (always seen in a tie-dyed shirt and baggy jeans) who would do to a person what he/she is doing to an animal, such as grab a guy's lip when he is fishing to show what it feels like. His catchphrases are "Now you know what it feels like" and "'Mon the (animal that is being abused)!"
 Harry (Kiernan), Linda (Dunbar) and George (Hemphill) Harry often becomes unjustifiably angry and even verbally abusive to his long-suffering wife, Linda, if she makes the simplest of mistakes, such as during a game of Monopoly or Countdown. George – a family friend with a soft spot for Linda – always gets caught in the middle of these arguments while trying to stop them. Linda and George always have the last laugh, however, as Harry is nearly always injured at the end of these episodes. The final sketch of Series 2, featuring a Hogmanay party at the couple's house, shows Harry's ultimate comeuppance, when Linda and George end up kissing passionately in front of him after he makes a fuss about some sausage rolls Linda said she'd made herself but had in fact, bought meat and pastry and "put the sausage rolls together" which, Harry tries to make clear, are not the same thing. They reappeared in Series 3 where they visit a zoo in episode one and a warehouse in episode four.
 Tom Gallagher (Hemphill) A Glasgow merchant who sets up stalls around Glasgow in an attempt to sell sports socks at the price of "two for a pound".
 Brenda (Karen Dunbar) A woman who repeatedly injures (often seriously) her husband, she then shouts "HELP HELP, there's been a terrible accident!" in a very bored, insincere manner. Her husband then usually replies with "Brenda, ya bastard!" Another Brenda was introduced in Series 4, depicting an overbearing woman who would, at unexpected moments, go "My heart was like that", and tap on her chest simultaneously.
 Rab McGlinchy (Kiernan)Rab is a stereotypical shellsuit-wearing, chain-smoking, hard-drinking Glaswegian ned in who is employed by the television company to translate the Scottish news, narrated by a newsreader, into the ned dialect. He is introduced thusly "...and here, interpreting for the Neds tonight, Rab McGlinchy."
 Singing Bar Boys Many old men who sing songs, changing the lyrics for comedic effect. Some of these characters later appeared in Still Game.
 Archie – Couple o' plums Two men harass their friend Archie in a bar. A typical sketch will involve Archie walking up to his mates, at which point they start shouting "ARCHIIIEE" whilst fondling him. Often they will shout "TITTIES" or "COUPLE O' PLUMS." Archie then gets frustrated with them and storms off after shouting: "Get aaf me ya pair ah bastards!"
 Take a Drink!In different situations, while several people are drinking (not necessarily alcoholic beverages), a person declines to drink. He/she is prompted to "Take a drink" by a constantly growing number of people until they give up and accept ("Awright then"), at which point everyone cheers him/her.
 Foulmouthed Fishermen Two fishermen aboard the trawler the "pearl necklace". They speak in a nautical sounding tone but the words used are rude and have very little to do with ships, tending to make references to sex or various parts of the anatomy.
 The Wee Girl with the Scooter Often characters are seen to be injured in various, and often serious, ways, such as being run over or pushed down the stairs, and when looking around to see the perpetrator, they are faced with a smiling young girl on a scooter, accompanied by some light ice cream van-esque music. The injured party and anyone accompanying them respond by saying, "Awww" and seem to forget about what has happened to them, occasionally dying from their injuries.
 Woman married to Derek (Karen Dunbar)A (gullible) woman on the phone to her mother recounting how great her husband Derek (who is never seen) is, completely unaware that he seems to be a self-serving liar and cheat. For example, he travels to Tenerife without his wife, telling her it's because she has an old red passport instead of a new blue one (red actually being the latest and blue no longer valid during recording) and she could not have a photograph taken because her teeth are "fillings with magnets" and would break the photo booth. The conversation ends when sheriff's officers appear to "repossess the beanbag" she is sitting on.
 Wank, Good Guy Various characters in different situations describing other people (and things) as either a "wank" or a "good guy", including ducks in a pond, gingerbread men, fish, and soldiers at the Changing of the Guard being described that way by Prince Philip.

Cast & crewMain Cast Ford Kiernan – Various Characters 
 Greg Hemphill – Various Characters 
 Karen Dunbar – Various Characters
 Paul Riley – Various Characters 
 Mark Cox – Various Characters 
 Julie Wilson Nimmo – Various Characters 
 Tom Urie – Various Characters
 Gordon McCorkell – Various Characters Main Crew Ford Kiernan – Writer & Creator 
 Greg Hemphill – Writer & Creator 
 Sanjeev Kohli – Additional Material 
  Donald McLeary – Additional Material 
 Iain Connell – Additional Material 
 Robert Florence – Additional Material 
 Michael Hines – Director 
 Colin Gilbert – Producer 
 Ewan Angus – Producer (For BBC Scotland)
 Rab Christie – Script Editor 
 John McNeil – Lighting Director

Episodes

Series 1 (1999)

1. Episode 1 – 13 January 1999

2. Episode 2 – 20 January 1999

3. Episode 3 – 27 January 1999

4. Episode 4 – 3 February 1999

5. Episode 5 – 10 February 1999

6. Episode 6 – 17 February 1999

Series 2 (1999)

1. Episode 1 – 11 November 1999

2. Episode 2 – 18 November 1999

3. Episode 3 – 25 November 1999

4. Episode 4 – 2 December 1999

5. Episode 5 – 9 December 1999

6. Episode 6 – 16 December 1999

Series 3 (2000)

1. Episode 1 – 15 November 2000

2. Episode 2 – 22 November 2000

3. Episode 3 – 29 November 2000

4. Episode 4 – 6 December 2000

5. Episode 5 – 13 December 2000

6. Episode 6 – 20 December 20002000 Hogmanay Special – 31 December 20002001 Hogmanay Special – 31 December 2001

Series 4 (2002)

1. Episode 1 – 18 January 2002

2. Episode 2 – 25 January 2002

3. Episode 3 – 1 February 2002

4. Episode 4 – 8 February 2002

5. Episode 5 – 15 February 2002

6. Episode 6 – 22 February 20022002 Hogmanay Special – 31 December 20022003 Hogmanay Special – 31 December 20032004 Hogmanay Special – 31 December 20042005 Hogmanay Special' – 31 December 2005

DVD releases

References

External links
 

Chewin' the Fat at The Comedy Unit

1999 Scottish television series debuts
2002 Scottish television series endings
BBC Radio comedy programmes
BBC Scotland television shows
BBC television comedy
BBC Scotland television sketch shows
Television shows set in Glasgow
Hogmanay
1990s Scottish television series
2000s Scottish television series
1990s British television sketch shows
2000s British comedy television series
Still Game